William Henry Murphy III (born August 2, 1973) is an American gospel recording artist and pastor. He started his music career in 2005, with the release of All Day on Epic Records. This album was listed on the Billboard Gospel Albums chart. His second album, The Sound, was released in 2007 on Central South, and was listed on the Top Gospel Albums chart as well. He self-released We Are One in 2011. This album was listed on the Top Gospel Albums chart, along with the Heatseekers Albums chart. His fourth album, God Chaser, was released in 2013 on Verity. The album reached the Gospel Albums chart, as well as the Billboard 200. Murphy is pastor of the dReam Center Church of Atlanta, which he founded.

Early life
Murphy was born in Detroit, Michigan on August 2, 1973. His father and grandfather are pastors/bishops. He moved to Atlanta, Georgia in 2001, with his wife Danielle and two children, to serve as the worship minister at New Birth.  He later founded The dReam Center Church of Atlanta in 2006, where Tasha Cobbs was on pastoral staff. His wife, Danielle, is also a pastor at the church. William is the Bishop of Worship in the FGBCF International ministry (Full Gospel Baptist Church Fellowship) under cofounder Bishop Paul S. Morton.

Music career
Murphy's music career began with the release of All Day on August 16, 2005 on Epic Records. This peaked at No. 22 on the Billboard Top Gospel Albums chart.

His second album, The Sound, was released by Central South Records on May 1, 2007, peaking at No. 23 on the same chart.

His third album, We Are One, was self-released on July 26, 2011, and it peaked at No. 16. It also placed on the Heatseekers Albums at No. 28.

His fourth album, God Chaser, was released on February 5, 2013 by Verity Records. It reached  No. 90 on the Billboard 200, and placed at No. 3 on the Gospel Albums chart.

Andy Kellman, writing for AllMusic, said that some of the tracks on this album are "potent numbers", while Cross Rhythms rated the album a seven out of ten.

God Chaser was nominated for Grammy Award for Best Gospel Album at the 56th Annual Grammy Awards.

Discography

References

External links
 Official website
 The Preaching App biography

1973 births
Living people
African-American songwriters
African-American Christians
Musicians from Atlanta
Musicians from Detroit
Songwriters from Georgia (U.S. state)
Songwriters from Michigan
Epic Records artists
21st-century African-American people
20th-century African-American people